Gerard López Segú (born 12 March 1979), usually known as just Gerard, is a Spanish former professional footballer, and a manager. An all-around midfielder, he was known for precision passes and ball control skills. During his career, he played for several clubs including Barcelona and Valencia, helping the latter reach the 2000 Champions League final.

Over nine seasons, Gerard amassed La Liga totals of 183 matches and 16 goals. He participated with Spain at Euro 2000.

Club career

Barcelona and Valencia
Born in Granollers, Barcelona, Catalonia, Gerard began his career in the FC Barcelona youth system and, in the 1996–97 season, made his professional debut with its B-team. As a 17-year-old he was signed by Valencia CF, making his La Liga debut on 31 August 1997 in a 1–2 away loss against RCD Mallorca (90 minutes played); for the 1998–99 campaign he was loaned to Deportivo Alavés, which had returned to the top flight after a four-decade absence.

After a breakout season with the Basque side, scoring seven goals, Gerard returned to Valencia, helping them reach the UEFA Champions League final. During this time with the Che, he came to be regarded as one of the top players in Spain and, after receiving interest from several top clubs in Europe, including Inter Milan, A.C. Milan and Manchester United, he decided to join his former club Barcelona in July 2000, in a deal worth €24 million. When he scored  three goals against Lazio on 5 April 2000, he become the youngest player in football history who scored goal at knock out stages of Champions League.

Gerard would go on to appear regularly for the team during his five-year second spell, although never an undisputed starter. Injuries also began to curtail his career.

Monaco and retirement
After leaving Barça with the 2005 national championship, Gerard moved abroad, playing two unassuming seasons with France's AS Monaco FC, also being severely injured. He returned to Spain for 2007–08, with top level's Recreativo de Huelva.

After rejecting a move to PAOK FC, Gerard trained for a few months with lowly EC Granollers, in Preferent Territorial de Catalunya. In mid-February 2009 he moved back to Catalonia, joining Girona FC until the end of the second division campaign; shortly after arriving he was injured again, but managed to net four times in only six Segunda División games.

International career
After a spectacular 1999–00 season with Valencia, on both fronts, Gerard received his first cap for Spain on 3 June 2000, in a 1–1 friendly with Sweden in Gothenburg. He went on to play in a further five matches, being selected for UEFA Euro 2000.

Coaching career
In October 2013, Gerard replaced Johan Cruyff as manager of Catalonia. On 22 July 2015, he was appointed at Barcelona B after their relegation to Segunda División B.

At the end of the 2016–17 season, Gerard coached his team back to the second level. Subsequently, he renewed his contract for another year.

On 25 April 2018, with the side placed inside the relegation zone, Gerard was relieved of his duties.

Personal life
Gerard's older brothers, Sergi and Julià López Segú (commonly known as Juli, born 1969), were also footballers, and defenders. The former, who also represented Barcelona, died by suicide at 39.

The latter played almost exclusively for Barça B whilst they were in the second tier, also having a brief top flight spell (13 matches) with Real Valladolid, in 1993–94.

Career statistics

International goals
Scores and results list Spain's goal tally first, score column indicates score after each Gerard goal.

Managerial statistics

Honours
Valencia
Supercopa de España: 1999
UEFA Champions League runner-up: 1999–2000

Barcelona
La Liga: 2004–05

References

External links
 FC Barcelona official profile
 
 
 
 
 
 

1979 births
Living people
Footballers from Granollers
Spanish footballers
Association football midfielders
La Liga players
Segunda División players
FC Barcelona Atlètic players
FC Barcelona players
Valencia CF players
Deportivo Alavés players
Recreativo de Huelva players
Girona FC players
Ligue 1 players
AS Monaco FC players
Spain youth international footballers
Spain under-21 international footballers
Spain international footballers
UEFA Euro 2000 players
Catalonia international footballers
Spanish expatriate footballers
Expatriate footballers in Monaco
Spanish expatriate sportspeople in Monaco
Spanish football managers
Segunda División managers
Segunda División B managers
FC Barcelona Atlètic managers